Anakes were deities worshipped in Attica and Argos. The word is a title which means lords or kings, for they were the sons of Zeus (and were also known as Dioscuri).  Some have associated the Anake(s) cult with worship of the goddess Helen. It is also possible that the name refers to three specific gods, but evidence for this is faint.

See also
 Anax

Ancient Greek religion